This is a list of United States national Golden Gloves champions in the super heavyweight division, along with the state or region they represented.

1982: Warren Thompson – Washington, D.C.
1983: Craig Payne – Detroit, Michigan
1984: Mike Williams – Lafayette, Louisiana
1985: James Pritchard – Louisville, Kentucky
1986: Tevin George – Louisiana
1987: Nathaniel Fitch – Knoxville, Tennessee
1988: Kevin Ford – Fort Worth, Texas
1989: Larry Donald – Cincinnati, Ohio
1990: Larry Donald – Cincinnati, Ohio
1991: Samson Poʻuha – Rocky Mountain
1992: Alvin Manley – Mid-South
1993: Lance Whitaker – Southern California
1994: Derrick Jefferson – Detroit, Michigan
1995: Tom Martin – Florida
1996: Alvin Manley – Knoxville, Tennessee

1997: Dominick Guinn – Mid South
1998: Tuese Ahkiong – Hawaii
1999: Dominick Guinn – Mid-South
2000: Steve Vukosa – New England
2001: Lonnie Zaid – Detroit, Michigan
2002: Malcolm Tann – Florida
2003: Travis Walker – Florida
2004: Raphael Butler - Minnesota 
2005: Gregory Corbin – Texas
2006: Felix Stewart – Tri-state/Ohio Valley
2007: Nathaniel James – Wisconsin
2007: Alexander Montagnet II - Louisiana
2008: Tor Hamer – New York metropolitan area
2009: Lenroy Thompson – Kansas City
2009: Anthony W Melberg - New Town, ND
2010: Roberto Morban – New York metropolitan area
2011: Lenroy Thompson – Kansas City
2012: Andrew Coleman – Cincinnati, Ohio
2013: Cam F. Awesome – Kansas City
2014: Jermaine Franklin – Michigan
2015: Darmani Rock – Philadelphia
2016: Marcus Carter – Detroit
2017: Richard Torrez – California
2018: Roney Hines - Cleveland
2019: Antonio Mireles - Iowa
2021: Skylar Lacy - Indiana

References

Golden Gloves